Lower Skeena River Provincial Park is a provincial park in British Columbia, Canada.

References

Provincial parks of British Columbia
Skeena Country
Year of establishment missing